1919 Clemence, provisional designation , is a bright Hungaria asteroid and suspected tumbler from the inner regions of the asteroid belt, approximately 4 kilometers in diameter. It was discovered on 16 September 1971, by American astronomer James Gibson together with Argentine astronomer Carlos Cesco at the Yale-Columbia Southern Station at Leoncito Astronomical Complex in Argentina. It is named after astronomer Gerald Clemence.

Orbit and classification 

Clemence is a member of the Hungaria family, which form the innermost dense concentration of asteroids in the Solar System. It orbits the Sun at a distance of 1.8–2.1 AU once every 2 years and 8 months (984 days). Its orbit has an eccentricity of 0.10 and an inclination of 19° with respect to the ecliptic.

Physical characteristics 

In the Tholen taxonomic scheme, Clemence is classified as an X-type asteroid. It has also been characterized as an E-type asteroid by the NEOWISE mission.

Rotation period 

In March 2005, a rotational lightcurve was obtained by American astronomer Brian Warner at his Palmer Divide Observatory in Colorado. Lightcurve analysis gave a rotation period of  hours and a brightness variation of  magnitude. While not being a slow rotator, Clemence has a significantly longer period than most other asteroids, which typically have a spin rate between 2 and 20 hours.

Czech astronomer Petr Pravec from the Ondřejov Observatory believes this may be a tumbling asteroid, yet observations are not sufficient to determine a non-principal axis rotation.

Diameter and albedo 

According to the surveys carried out by the NEOWISE mission of NASA's Wide-field Infrared Survey Explorer, the asteroid measures 3.2 kilometers in diameter and its surface has an outstandingly high albedo of 0.71, while the Collaborative Asteroid Lightcurve Link assumes an albedo of 0.30 and calculates a somewhat larger diameter of 4.95 kilometers with an absolute magnitude of 13.45.

Naming 

This minor planet was named after American astronomer Gerald Maurice Clemence (1908–1974), first scientific director of the United States Naval Observatory and professor of astronomy at the Yale Observatory, known for his work on the theory of the motion of Mars and Mercury, on the system of astronomical constants, and other research in celestial mechanics. He served as president of the American Astronomical Society and of IAU. The official  was published by the Minor Planet Center on 20 February 1976.

References

External links 
  
 Lightcurve plot of 1919 Clemence, Palmer Divide Observatory, B. D. Warner (2005)
 Asteroid Lightcurve Database (LCDB), query form (info )
 Dictionary of Minor Planet Names, Google books
 Asteroids and comets rotation curves, CdR – Observatoire de Genève, Raoul Behrend
 Discovery Circumstances: Numbered Minor Planets (1)-(5000) – Minor Planet Center
 
 

001919
Discoveries by James B. Gibson (astronomer)
Discoveries by Carlos Ulrrico Cesco
Named minor planets
001919
19710916